What Happened on September 11 is an  HBO Family documentary introducing the events of 9/11 to a young audience. Directed and produced by Amy Schatz, this half hour film features school children in conversation with survivors and family members, historical segments, and classroom scenes exploring 9/11 through artwork and poetry.

It was produced for HBO in collaboration with the 9/11 Tribute Museum.

References

External links
 Full film online

Documentary films about the September 11 attacks
2019 television films
2019 films
American documentary films
2019 documentary films
2010s American films